Boom is the second studio album by the American garage rock band The Sonics, released in February 1966.

Release 
Boom was released in 1966 by record label Etiquette ET-ALBS-027.

It was re-released in 1999 by Norton Records NW 905.

Reception 

Cub Koda of AllMusic called the album "every bit as explosive and influential as their debut outing". They rated it 4 1/2 stars.

Legacy 

Like its predecessor Here Are The Sonics (1965), Boom was influential on later punk rock music (see protopunk).

Track listing

Personnel 
 The Sonics

 Gerry Roslie – keyboard, vocals
 Andy Parypa – bass guitar, vocals
 Larry Parypa – lead guitar, vocals
 Rob Lind – saxophone, vocals
 Bob Bennett – drums

 Technical

 Kent Morrill – Production
 Buck Ormsby – Production
 Bill Wiley -  Engineer

References

External links 

 

1966 albums
The Sonics albums
Norton Records albums
Big Beat Records (Ace Records subsidiary) albums